Euphorbia baioensis is a species of flowering plant in the family Euphorbiaceae.

This spiny succulent plant is originally from Kenya.  It is found in tropical deserts and flourishes in hot dry conditions.

References

S.Carter, Hooker's Icon. Pl. 39: t. 3870 (1982).

baioensis